Borovitsa is a village in Vidin Province, Bulgaria. It is in the municipality of Belogradchik.

Borovitsa means "pine stone" - the name of the rock that towers over the village. On top of the rock was once a huge pine tree, eventually destroyed by fire. The ancient village was located next to the stone, so people could hide in the woods in case of attack by the Ottoman invaders. After the Liberation of Bulgaria, the village has gradually been built out along the Lom River and along the road to Belogradchik. The inhabitants have in the past engaged in farming, animal husbandry and beekeeping. A few kilometers from the village the Romans had a military camp - Falcon or Falkovets. A Roman colony was on the outskirts of Borovitsa.

The only remnants remain of the old village church, built in 1866, situated 2.5 km from the village to the west. The frescoes, icons and wooden altar are preserved. The bell tower dominates the valley among the rocks and woods. Nearby are the remains of a small school. At about 500 meters from the village is a waterfall, "Boboka".

References

Villages in Vidin Province
Belogradchik Municipality